Martina Navratilova and Pam Shriver were the defending champions and won in the final 5–7, 6–4, 6–2 against Kathy Jordan and Elizabeth Smylie.

Seeds 
Champion seeds are indicated in bold text while text in italics indicates the round in which those seeds were eliminated.

Draw

Finals

Top half

Section 1

Section 2

Bottom half

Section 3

Section 4

External links 
1987 US Open – Women's draws and results at the International Tennis Federation

Women's Doubles
US Open (tennis) by year – Women's doubles
1987 in women's tennis
1987 in American women's sports